FC Metz Feminines (commonly known as FC Metz or Metz) is a French football club based in Metz, Lorraine which plays in D2 Féminine. The club is the women's side of the French football club of the same name and was founded in 1974. 

FC Metz plays its home matches at the Stade du Batzenthal 1 in Algrange which has a capacity of 2,500 spectators. They are coached by David Fanzel.

Players

Current squad

Updated 2 October 2022.

. Sources: Official website, footofeminin.fr, soccerway.com'' and Le Répbublican Lorrain,

References

External links
  

 
Women's football clubs in France
Association football clubs established in 1974
FC Metz
Division 1 Féminine clubs
1974 establishments in France
Sport in Metz
Football clubs in Grand Est